Nazmi Zade al-Bagdadi was a Turkish poet and the father of historian Morteza Effendi and writer Hussein Effendi. He authored a collection of Turkish poetry.

Personal life 
He had at least two children: the writer and translator Hussain Nazmi Zadeh, who died in 1717 and was the translator of the Book of Wassef al-Hadrah; and the historian and translator Mortada Nazmi Zadeh, who died in 1723 and was the author of The History of Baghdad, known as Kalashin Khalfa or Rawdah al-Khalafa.

Death 
Nazmi Zade died in 1655.

References 

1655 deaths
Year of birth missing
Turkish male poets